The 2012 Arizona Wildcats baseball team represented the University of Arizona in the 2012 NCAA Division I baseball season.  The Wildcats played their home games at Hi Corbett Field, off campus in Tucson, AZ.  This was the first full season for the Wildcats at Hi Corbett Field, which is the former spring training home of the Cleveland Indians and Colorado Rockies. Andy Lopez was in his eleventh season as Arizona Wildcats baseball head coach. Lopez was in his twenty-fourth year as head coach. The Wildcats tied for first in the Pac-12 Conference with UCLA, finishing with a 20–10 conference record. The Wildcats finished the season with a 48–17 record. Six players were picked in the 2012 Major League Baseball Draft.

In the 2012 NCAA Division I baseball tournament, the Wildcats performed well in the NCAA Regional and Super Regional rounds, hosting in Tucson for first time since 1992 and winning 5 straight games. The Wildcats defeated Missouri once and  twice to win the Tucson Regional. They then won the Tucson Super Regional by defeating St. John's in two consecutive games. The team reached the 2012 College World Series for the sixteenth time in program history, beating Florida State twice in the first and third game and UCLA in game two.  The Wildcats faced two-time defending champion South Carolina in the championship series, sweeping both games to win the 2012 College World Series. This was Arizona's first College World Series championship since 1986, and fourth overall.  They finished the post-season with a 10–0 record and were only the second team after South Carolina the previous year to do so.

Roster

Opening day

Schedule

! style="" | Regular Season
|- valign="top" 

|- bgcolor="#ccffcc"
| 1 || February 17 ||  || Hi Corbett Field || 3–1 || K. Heyer (1–0) || J.Straka (0–1) || S. Manthei (1) || 3997 || 1–0 || –
|- bgcolor="#FFE6E6"
| 2 || February 18 || North Dakota State|| Hi Corbett Field || 2–8 || L. Anderson (1–0) || V. Littleman (0–1) || ||  2920 || 1–1 || –
|- bgcolor="#ccffcc"
| 3 || February 19 || North Dakota State|| Hi Corbett Field || 8–0 || J. Farris (1–0) || Z. Wentz (0–1) || || 1953 || 2–1 || –
|- bgcolor="#ccffcc"
| 4 || February 21 ||  || Hi Corbett Field || 12–6 || L. Long (1–0) || J. Campbell (0–1) ||  || 1694 || 3–1 ||–
|- bgcolor="#ccffcc"
| 5 || February 24 ||  || Hi Corbett Field || 8–1 ||  K. Heyer (2–0) || D. Varnadore (1–1) ||  || 2470 || 4–1 ||–
|- bgcolor="#ccffcc"
| 6 || February 25 || Auburn || Hi Corbett Field || 15–4 || K. Wade (1–0) || S. Smith (0–2) || ||  || 5–1 ||–
|- bgcolor="#FFE6E6"
| 7 || February 25 || Auburn || Hi Corbett Field || 3–8 || D. Koger (1–0) || J. Farris (1–1) || || 1362 || 5–2 ||–
|-

|- bgcolor="#ccffcc"
| 9 || March 2 ||  || Hi Corbett Field || 7–1 || K. Heyer (3–0) || B. Suter (0–1) ||  || 1611 || 6–2 ||–
|- bgcolor="#ccffcc"
| 10 || March 3 || Harvard || Hi Corbett  Field || 3–1 || K. Wade (2–0) || J. Novak (0–1) || M. Troupe (1) || 2187 || 7–2 || –
|- bgcolor="ccffcc"
| 11 || March 4 || Harvard || Hi Corbett Field || 13–2 || J. Farris (2–1) || J. Kremers (0–1) || || 1745 || 8–2 ||–
|- bgcolor="#ccffcc"
| 12 || March 6 ||  || Hi Corbett Field || 6–0 || L. Long (3–0) || E. Wolf (0–1) ||  || 1248 || 9–2 ||–
|- bgcolor="#ccffcc"
| 13 || March 7 || UC Davis || Hi Corbett Field || 6–4 || M. Troupe (1–0) || C. Levy (3–1) || || 1305 || 10–2 ||–
|- bgcolor="ccffcc"
| 14 || March 9 ||  || Hi Corbett Field || 9–2 || K. Heyer (4–0) || J. Battistelli (1–2) ||  || 1310 || 11–2 ||–
|- bgcolor="ccffcc"
| 15 || March 10 || Eastern Michigan || Hi Corbett Field || 16–7 || K. Wade (3–0) || S. Weber (1–2) || || 1623 || 12–2 || –
|- bgcolor="ccffcc"
| 16 || March 11 || Eastern Michigan || Hi Corbett Field || 9–8 || M. Troupe (2–0) || N. Butara (0–1) ||  || 1801 || 13–2 ||–
|- bgcolor="#FFE6E6"
| 17 || March 13 ||  || Reckling Park || 1–5 || A. Benak (3–0) || L. Long (2–1) || || 3599 || 13–3 ||–
|- bgcolor="#ccffcc"
| 18 || March 14 || Rice || Reckling Park || 8–5 || S. Manthei (1–0) || T. Wall (3–2) || M. Troupe (2) || 3640 || 14–3 ||0–0
|- bgcolor="#FFE6E6"
| 19 || March 16 ||   || Hi Corbett Field || 0–6 || JD. Leckenby (3–2) || K. Heyer (4–1) || || 2306 || 14–4 ||0–1
|- bgcolor="#ccffcc"
| 20 || March 17 || Washington State || Hi Corbett Field || 8–7 || S. Manthei (2–0) || J. Pistorese (2–1) || M. Troupe (3) || 1496 || 15–4 || 1–1
|- bgcolor="#ccffcc"
| 21 || March 17 || Washington State || Hi Corbett Field || 12–9 || S. Manthei (3–0) || K. Swannack (1–2) ||  || 2025 || 16–4 || 2–1
|- bgcolor="#FFE6E6"
| 22 || March 20 ||   || Hi Corbett Field || 4–7 || E. Mott (1–2) || S. Manthei (3–1)  ||  || 1286 || 15–5 || 2–1
|- bgcolor="#FFE6E6"
| 23 || March 21 || New Mexico State || Hi Corbett Field || 8–13 || R. Montoya (1–0) || L. Long (2–2) || || 1520 || 16–6 ||2–1
|- bgcolor="#FFE6E6"
| 24 || March 23 || Oregon State || Goss Stadium || 5–6 ||T. Bryant (3–0) || S. Manthei (3–2) || || 1623 || 16–7 ||2–2
|- bgcolor="#ccffcc"
| 25 || March 24 || Oregon State || Goss Stadium || 5–4 || S. Manthei (4–2) || C. Brocker (0–3) || M. Troupe (4) || 1873 || 17–7 ||3–2
|- bgcolor="#ccffcc"
| 26 || March 25 || Oregon State || Goss Stadium || 7–5 || J. Farris (3–1) || J. Fry (1–1) || M. Troupe (5) || 1512 || 18–7 ||4–2
|- bgcolor="#ccffcc"
| 27 || March 30 ||  || Hi Corbett Field || 8–7 || S. Manthei (5–2) || D. Schmidt (2–1) ||  || 4191 || 19–7 ||5–2
|- bgcolor="#ccffcc"
| 28 || March 31 || Stanford || Hi Corbett Field || 4–2 || K. Wade (4–0) || B. Mooneyham (5–1) ||  || 3506 || 20–7 ||6–2
|- bgcolor="#ccffcc"
| 29 || April 1 || Stanford  || Hi Corbett Field || 6–2 || J. Farris (4–1) ||J. Hochstatter (3–3) || || 2959 || 21–7 || 7–2
|-

|- bgcolor="FFE6E6"
| 25 || April 4 ||  || Brent Brown Ballpark || 4–5 || J. Gendlek (4–3) || T. Crawford (0–1) || || 2014  || 21–8 || 7–2
|- bgcolor="ccffcc"
| 26 || April 5 ||  || Spring Mobile Ballpark || 11–2 || K. Heyer (5–1) || J. Pond (2–5) || || 580 || 22–8 || 8–2
|- bgcolor="FFE6E6"
| 27 || April 6 || Utah || Spring Mobile Ballpark || 6–7 || M. Watrous (2–0) || S. Manthei (5–3) || T. Wagner (1) || 461 || 22–9 || 8–3
|- bgcolor="ccffcc"
| 28 || April 7 || Utah || Spring Mobile Ballpark || 11–7 || T. Hale (1–0) || T. Tripp (0–2) || M. Troupe (6) || 565 || 23–9 || 9–3
|- bgcolor="ccffcc"
| 29 || April 13 || UCLA || Hi Corbett Field || 4–3 || K. Heyer (6–1) || D. Berg (4–1) || || 4080 || 24–9 || 10–3
|- bgcolor="FFE6E6"
| 30 || April 14 || UCLA || Hi Corbett Field || 3–15 || N. Vander Tuig (4–2) || K. Wade (4–1) || || 2380 || 24–10 || 10–4
|- bgcolor="FFE6E6"
| 31 || April 15 || UCLA || Hi Corbett Field || 2–6 || Z. Weiss (2–1) || J. Farris (4–2) || || 2858  || 24–11 || 10–5
|- bgcolor="FFE6E6"
| 32 || April 17 ||  || Packard Stadium || 8–12 || J. Lopez (1–0) || M. Troupe (2–1) || || 2972 || 24–12 || 10–5
|- bgcolor="ccffcc"
| 33 || April 20 ||  || Husky Ballpark || 10–2 || || || || || 25–12 || 11–5
|- bgcolor="ccffcc"
| 34 || April 21 || Washington || Husky Ballpark || 4–1 || K. Wade (5–1) || T. Kane (2–1) || || 518 || 26–12 || 12–5
|- bgcolor="FFE6E6"
| 35 || April 22 || Washington || Husky Ballpark || 5–6 || T. Kane (3–1) || S. Manthei (5–4) || || 532 || 26–13 || 12–6
|- bgcolor="ccffcc"
| 36 || April 27 ||  || Hi Corbett Field || 24–7 || K. Heyer (8–1) || J. Long (2–6) || || 2047 || 27–13 || 12–6
|- bgcolor="ccffcc"
| 37 || April 28 || East Tennessee State || Hi Corbett Field || 6–4 || K. Wade (6–1) || J. Long (5–5) || || 1706 || 28–13 || 12–6
|- bgcolor="ccffcc"
| 38 || April 29 || East Tennessee State || Hi Corbett Field || 21–6 || J. Farris (5–2) || K. Doane || || 1737 || 29–13 || 12–6
|-

|- bgcolor="FFE6E6"
| 39 || May 4 ||  || Hi Corbett Field || 1–6 || A. Keudell (8–3) || K. Heyer (8–2) || || 3317 || 29–14 || 12–7
|- bgcolor="ccffcc"
| 40 || May 5 || Oregon || Hi Corbett Field || 12–6 || T. Crawford (1–1) || J. Reed (5–3) || || 3385 || 30–14 || 13–7
|- bgcolor="FFE6E6"
| 41 || May 6 || Oregon || Hi Corbett Field || 1–3 || J. Sherfy (4–2) || J. Farris (5–3) || || 1996 || 30–15 || 13–8
|- bgcolor="ccffcc"
| 42 || May 11 || California || Evans Diamond || 3–1 || K. Heyer (9–2) || M. Theofanopoul (3–5) || || 276 || 31–15 || 14–8
|- bgcolor="ccffcc"
| 43 || May 12 || California || Evans Diamond || 4–1 || K. Wade (7–1) || M. Flemer (7–4) || || 474 || 32–15 || 15–8
|- bgcolor="ccffcc"
| 44 || May 13 || California || Evans Diamond || 7–4 || T. Hale (2–0) || J. Jones (4–7) || || 774 || 33–15 || 16–8
|- bgcolor="ccffcc"
| 45 || May 16 || Arizona State || Packard Stadium || 10–2 || M. Troupe (3–1) || D. Gillies (1–4) || || 3098 || 34–15 || 16–8
|- bgcolor="ccffcc"
| 46 || May 18 ||  || Dedeaux Field || 11–1 || K. Heyer (10–2) || B. Mount (1–7) || || 501 || 35–15 || 17–8
|- bgcolor="FFE6E6"
| 47 || May 19 || USC || Dedeaux Field || 4–8 || A. Triggs (5–6) || K. Wade (7–2) || || 548  || 35–16 || 17–9
|- bgcolor="ccffcc"
| 48 || May 20 || USC || Dedeaux Field || 6–1 || J. Farris (6–3) || S. Tarpley (5–3) || || 706 || 36–16 || 18–9
|- bgcolor="ccffcc"
| 51 || May 25 || Arizona State || Hi Corbett Field || 1–0 || K. Heyer (11–2) || B. Rodgers (10–3) || || || 37–16 || 19–9
|- bgcolor="FFE6E6"
| 52 || May 26 || Arizona State || Hi Corbett Field || 7–9 || T. Williams (12–2) || K. Wade (7–3) ||  || 5677 || 37–17 || 19–10
|- bgcolor="ccffcc"
| 53 || May 27 || Arizona State || Hi Corbett Field || 8–7 || S. Manthei (6–4) || R. Ravago (4–1) || || 2927 || 38–17 || 20–10
|-

|-
! style="" | Post-Season
|-

|- bgcolor="#ccffcc"
| 54 || June 1 || Missouri || Hi Corbett Field || 15–3 || K. Heyer (12–2) || B. Holovach (7–5) ||  || 5086 || 39–17 || 1–0
|- bgcolor="#ccffcc"
| 55 || June 2 ||  || Hi Corbett Field || 16–4 || K. Wade (8–3) || J. Ruxer (8–3) ||  || 4007 || 40–17 || 2–0
|- bgcolor="#ccffcc"
| 56 || June 4 || Louisville || Hi Corbett Field || 16–3 || J. Farris (7–3) || J. Thompson (9–4) || None'' || 3485 || 41–17 || 3–0
|-

|- bgcolor="#ccffcc"
| 57 || June 8 || St. John's || Hi Corbett Field || 7–6 || M. Troupe (4–1) || K. Kilpatrick (3–3) || || 2514 || 42–17 || 4–0
|- bgcolor="#ccffcc"
| 58 || June 9 || St. John's || Hi Corbett Field || 7–4 || K. Wade (9–3) || S. Hagan (9–3) ||  || 3907 || 43–17 || 5–0
|-

|- bgcolor="#ccffcc"
| 59 || June 15 || Florida State || TD Ameritrade Park || 4–3 || M. Troupe (5–1)|| R. Benincasa ||  || 22,391 || 44–17 || 6–0
|- bgcolor="#ccffcc"
| 60 || June 17 || UCLA || TD Ameritrade Park || 4–0  || K. Wade (10–3) || N. Vander Tuig (10–4) || || 19,198 || 45–17 || 7–0
|- bgcolor="#ccffcc"
| 61 || June 21 || Florida State || TD Ameritrade Park || 10–3 || K. Heyer (13–2) || Leibrandt (8–3) || ||20,596 || 46–17 || 8–0
|- bgcolor="#ccffcc"
| 62 || June 24 || South Carolina  || TD Ameritrade Park || 5–1  || K. Wade (11–3) || F. Koumas (2–3) ||  || 24,748 || 47–17  || 9–0
|- bgcolor="#ccffcc"
| 63 || June 25 || South Carolina || TD Ameritrade Park || 4–1  || M. Troupe (6–1) || M.Price (5–5) || || 23,872 || 48–17 || 10–0
|-

Tucson Regional

Tucson Super Regional

College World Series

Rankings

Arizona Wildcats in the 2012 MLB Draft

The following members of the Arizona Wildcats baseball program were drafted in the 2012 Major League Baseball Draft.

 Refsnyder would eventually make his Major League debut with the Yankees in 2015
Rickard would make his Major League Debut with the Baltimore Orioles in 2016.
Mejia would make his Major League Debut with the St. Louis Cardinals in 2017.

References

Arizona Wildcats baseball seasons
Arizona Wildcats
Pac-12 Conference baseball champion seasons
College World Series seasons
NCAA Division I Baseball Championship seasons
Arizona
Arizona Wildcats